The American Society of Cinematographers Technology Committee (ASC Technology Committee) is a group of cinematographers and a broad collection of A-list motion picture industry participants working on how to make high quality motion pictures using the new technologies and techniques presented by the massive changes taking place in pre-production, cameras, production, post-production, theatrical delivery and exhibition, and non-theatrical (home) delivery and exhibition.  The ASC Technology Committee has been one of the industry leaders in these areas.  Significant work produced includes the ASC-DCI Standard Evaluation Material (StEM), the ASC-PGA Camera Assessment Series (CAS), and the ASC Color Decision List (ASC CDL).

The ASC Technology Committee is the first committee in the ASC's nearly 100-year history that has some officers and participants who are not ASC Member cinematographers.

 Chair: Curtis Clark, ASC
 Vice-chair: Richard Edlund, ASC
 Vice-chair: Steven Poster, ASC
 Secretary: David Reisner

References 
Clark, Curtis and Reisner, David et al. "Progress Report: ASC Technology Committee", SMPTE Motion Imaging Journal, September 2008
Clark, Curtis and Reisner, David et al. "Progress Report: ASC Technology Committee", SMPTE Motion Imaging Journal, September 2007
Clark, Curtis and Reisner, David et al. "Progress Report: ASC Technology Committee", SMPTE Motion Imaging Journal, September 2006
Bankston, Douglas. "ASC Celebrates 90th Anniversary", Variety (magazine), October 29, 2008
Bankston, Douglas. "ASC Technology Committee Update", American Cinematographer, December 2006
ASC CDL
DCI (Digital Cinema Initiatives)
PGA (Producers Guild of America)

External links
 ASC Technology Committee

Cinematography organizations
Professional associations based in the United States